Tebenikhin is a Slavic masculine surname, its feminine counterpart is Tebenikhina. Notable people with the surname include:

Amir Tebenikhin (born 1977), Kazakhstani pianist
Irina Tebenikhina (born 1978), Russian volleyball player

Russian-language surnames